Jesus College is one of the constituent colleges of the University of Oxford in England.  Its alumni include politicians, lawyers, bishops, poets, and academics.  Some went on to become fellows of the college; 14 students later became principal of the college. It was founded in 1571 by Queen Elizabeth I, at the request of a Welsh clergyman, Hugh Price, who was Treasurer of St David's Cathedral in Pembrokeshire. The college still has strong links with Wales, and about 15% of students are Welsh. There are 340 undergraduates and 190 students carrying out postgraduate studies. Old members of Jesus College are sometimes known as "Jesubites".

From the world of politics, the college's alumni include two Prime Ministers (Harold Wilson of Britain and Kevin Rudd of Australia), Jamaica's Chief Minister and first Premier (Norman Washington Manley), a Speaker of the House of Commons (Sir William Williams), a leader of the Liberal Democrats (Sir Ed Davey), a co-founder of Plaid Cymru (D. J. Williams) and a co-founder of the African National Congress (Pixley ka Isaka Seme). Members of Parliament from the three main political parties in the United Kingdom have attended the college, as have politicians from Australia (Neal Blewett), New Zealand (Harold Rushworth), Sri Lanka (Lalith Athulathmudali) and the United States (Heather Wilson). The list of lawyers include one Lord Chancellor (Lord Sankey) and one Law Lord (Lord du Parcq). The list of clergy includes three Archbishops of Wales (A. G. Edwards, Glyn Simon and Gwilym Williams). Celticists associated with the college include Sir John Morris-Jones, Sir Thomas (T. H.) Parry-Williams and William John Gruffydd, whilst the list of historians includes the college's first graduate, David Powel, who published the first printed history of Wales in 1584, and the Victorian historian John Richard Green. The list includes a recipient of the Victoria Cross (Angus Buchanan) and T. E. Lawrence, better known as "Lawrence of Arabia." Yuval Noah Harari, the author of the popular science bestsellers Sapiens: A Brief History of Humankind (2014), Homo Deus: A Brief History of Tomorrow (2016), and 21 Lessons for the 21st Century (2018) was a student at the college. Record-breaking quadriplegic solo sailor Hilary Lister was also a student there, whilst from the field of arts and entertainment there are names such as Magnus Magnusson, presenter of Mastermind, the National Poet of Wales Gwyn Thomas and television weather presenters Kirsty McCabe and Siân Lloyd.

Because women were barred from studying at Jesus College for over four centuries (from its foundation until 1974), this list of alumni consists almost entirely of men.

Alumni
The sub-headings are given as a general guide and some names might fit under more than one category.

Abbreviations used in the following tables
M – Year of matriculation at Jesus College (a dash indicates that the individual did not matriculate at the college)
G – Year of graduation / conclusion of study at Jesus College (a dash indicates that the individual graduated from another college)
DNG – Did not graduate: left the college without taking a degree
? – Year unknown; an approximate year is used for table-sorting purposes.
(F/P) after name – later became a fellow or principal of Jesus College, and included on the list of principals and fellows
(HF) after name – later became an Honorary Fellow of Jesus College, and included on the list of Honorary Fellows

Degree abbreviations
Undergraduate degree: BA – Bachelor of Arts
Postgraduate degrees:

BCL – Bachelor of Civil Law
BD – Bachelor of Divinity
BLitt – Bachelor of Letters
BMus – Bachelor of Music
BSc – Bachelor of Science
BTh – Bachelor of Theology
MA – Master of Arts
MB – Bachelor of Medicine
MD – Doctor of Medicine

MLitt – Master of Letters
MSc – Master of Science
MPhil – Master of Philosophy
DCL – Doctor of Civil Law
DD – Doctor of Divinity
DLitt – Doctor of Letters
DMus – Doctor of Music
DPhil – Doctor of Philosophy
DTh – Doctor of Theology

The subject studied and the degree classification are included, where known.  Until the early 19th century, undergraduates read for a Bachelor of Arts degree that included study of Latin and Greek texts, mathematics, geometry, philosophy and theology.  Individual subjects at undergraduate level were only introduced later: for example, Mathematics (1805), Natural Science (1850), Jurisprudence (1851, although it had been available before this to students who obtained special permission), Modern History (1851) and Theology (1871). Geography and Modern Languages were introduced in the 20th century. Music had been available as a specialist subject before these changes; medicine was studied as a post-graduate subject.

Politicians and civil servants

Harold Wilson studied at Jesus College from 1934 to 1937, and was later the Prime Minister of the United Kingdom during two periods (from October 1964 to June 1970, and from March 1974 to April 1976). More than 30 other Members of Parliament have been educated at the college, from Sir John Salusbury who was elected as MP for Denbighshire in 1601 to Theresa Villiers who was elected as MP for Chipping Barnet in 2005. Sir Leoline Jenkins, who became a fellow and later the principal of the college, was Secretary of State for the Northern Department from 1680 to 1681 and Secretary of State for the Southern Department from 1681 to 1685. Sir William Williams served as Speaker of the House of Commons from 1680 to 1685 and as Solicitor General for England and Wales from 1687 to 1689. Evan Cotton was MP for Finsbury East before holding the position of President of the Bengal Legislative Council from 1922 to 1925. Several Welsh politicians have been educated at the college, some representing constituencies in Wales (such as Sir John Wogan, representing Pembrokeshire at various times between 1614 and 1644) and others working outside Parliament, such as D. J. Williams (a co-founder of the Welsh nationalist party Plaid Cymru). Leader of the Liberal Democrats 2020–present, Sir Ed Davey, was also educated at the college.

Other students at the college have held political offices in other countries. Norman Manley was Chief Minister of Jamaica from 1955 to 1959, and served as its first and only Premier from 1959 to 1962 whilst negotiating its independence. In 2017, former Australian Prime Minister Kevin Rudd began studying for a doctorate on Xi Jinping at the college. P. T. Rajan was Chief Minister of Madras Presidency between April and August 1936. Heather Wilson was the first Old Member of the college to sit in the United States House of Representatives, where she represented New Mexico's 1st congressional district from 1998 to 2009. The Australian politician Neal Blewett was a member of the Australian House of Representatives from 1977 to 1994, a Government Minister from 1983 to 1994 and High Commissioner to the UK from 1994 to 1998. Pixley ka Isaka Seme, who studied for a BCL between 1906 and 1909, was one of the founder members of the African National Congress.

Civil servants and diplomats educated at Jesus College include Sir Edgar Vaughan (British Ambassador to Colombia from 1964 to 1966), Gunasena de Soyza (High Commissioner for Ceylon in Britain from 1960 to 1961), Sir Frederick Atkinson (Chief Economic Adviser to HM Treasury from 1977 to 1979), Sir Thomas Williams Phillips (Permanent Secretary of the Ministry of Labour from 1935 to 1944 and Chairman of the War Damage Commission from 1949 to 1959), Eryl Davies (a former Chief Inspector of Schools for Wales), and Christopher Lintrup Paus (a long-time British diplomat in Oslo).

Judges and lawyers

Several prominent judges and lawyers were educated at the college. Viscount Sankey, who was Lord Chancellor from 1929 to 1935, studied for a BA in History and a BCL between 1885 and 1891. Lord du Parcq was appointed as a Lord of Appeal in Ordinary in 1946. Sir Richard Richards became Lord Chief Baron of the Exchequer in 1817. The Scottish MP and lawyer Lord Murray was appointed a Senator of the College of Justice in 1979. The solicitor Sir David Lewis was Lord Mayor of the City of London from 2007 to 2008. Other lawyers who studied at the college include James Chadwin QC, who defended the Yorkshire Ripper, and Sir Arthur James, who prosecuted the Great Train Robbers and later became a judge of the Court of Appeal. Academic lawyers include J Duncan M Derrett, Professor of Oriental Laws in the University of London from 1965 to 1982, and Alfred Hazel, Reader in English Law at All Souls College, Oxford.

Clergy

Three Archbishops of Wales have studied at Jesus College. A. G. Edwards, the first archbishop of the Church in Wales after its disestablishment, read Literae Humaniores from 1871 to 1874, and was archbishop from 1920 to 1934. Glyn Simon, who was a student from 1922 to 1926, was Archbishop of Wales from 1968 to 1971. He was succeeded by Gwilym Williams, who was archbishop from 1971 to 1982.

Other bishops to have held office in Wales include Francis Davies, Roy Davies, John Harris, and Morgan Owen (who were all Bishops of Llandaff), Humphrey Humphreys, Daniel Lewis Lloyd and Humphrey Lloyd (who were Bishops of Bangor), William Lloyd and John Wynne (who were Bishops of St Asaph), and John Owen and William Thomas (who were Bishops of St David's). William Havard was a Welsh rugby international before becoming Bishop of St Asaph, then Bishop of St David's.

Former students of the college to have become bishops outside England and Wales include Rowland Ellis (Bishop of Aberdeen and Orkney from 1906 to 1911), Richard Meredith (Bishop of Leighlin from 1579 to 1597), and John Rider (Bishop of Killaloe 1612 to 1632). In the twentieth century, bishops to have studied at the college include Kenneth Cragg (assistant Bishop of Jerusalem from 1970 to 1973), John Dickinson (assistant Bishop of Melanesia from 1931 to 1937), Gordon Roe (Bishop of Huntingdon from 1980 to 1997), Alwyn Williams (Bishop of Durham from 1939 to 1952 and Bishop of Winchester from 1952 to 1961), and Clifford Woodward (Bishop of Bristol from 1933 to 1946 and Bishop of Gloucester from 1946 to 1953).

Several former students have been appointed as cathedral deans; many others became parish priests in Wales and elsewhere in the Anglican church, some also finding time for other activities such as writing poetry or pursuing antiquarian interests.  At least five have been Dean of Bangor – Henry Edwards, Henry James, Evan Lewis, John Pryce and James Vincent. Llewelyn Hughes was Dean of Ripon from 1951 to 1967, Alex Wedderspoon was Dean of Guildford from 1987 to 2001, and Wesley Carr was Dean of Westminster Abbey from 1997 to 2006. Edmund Meyrick, who studied at the college between 1656 and 1659, became Treasurer of St David's Cathedral; his bequest founded the college's Meyrick scholarships for students from North Wales, and scholarships from this fund are still awarded. The lexicographer John Davies of Mallwyd, who translated the Bible into Welsh, studied at the college. In the mid-19th century, some Anglican priests were influenced by John Henry Newman and converted to Roman Catholicism, including David Lewis; Edmund Ffoulkes converted too, but later went back to Anglicanism, becoming vicar of the University Church of St Mary the Virgin in Oxford. John David Jenkins, who was Canon of Pietermaritzburg for a time, was later nicknamed the "Rail men's Apostle" for his ministry to railway workers in Oxford. David Thomas, a priest in Gwynedd, was instrumental in the foundation of a Welsh church in the Welsh settlement in Argentina.

Some students have become ministers in other denominations of Christianity.  Methodists include David Charles and Christopher Bassett; Baptists include Gwilym Davies (the first person to broadcast on the radio in Welsh, in 1923); Welsh Presbyterians include William David Davies and Gwilym Edwards; Unitarians include John Islan Jones; and Catholics include John Hugh Jones and the Benedictine monk and poet Sylvester Houédard.

Military personnel

Celticists

Classicists and archeologists

Geographers, geologists and cartographers

Historians and antiquarians

Language and literature academics

Philosophers and theologians

Mathematics, medicine and science

Mathematicians to have studied at Jesus College include Nigel Hitchin (Savilian Professor of Geometry at Oxford since 1997), the Canadian Jonathan Borwein and Jim Mauldon (who taught at Oxford before moving to the United States to teach at Amherst College, Massachusetts). David E. Evans is Professor of Mathematics at Cardiff University, and H. W. Lloyd Tanner was Professor of Mathematics and Astronomy at one of its predecessor institutions, the University College of South Wales and Monmouthshire. Several noted individuals from biology, botany and zoology were educated at the college, including the Welsh clergyman Hugh Davies (whose Welsh Botanology of 1813 cross-referenced the Welsh-language and the scientific names of plants), Edward Bagnall Poulton (Professor of Zoology at Oxford) and James Brontë Gatenby (Professor of Zoology at Trinity College, Dublin). Frank Greenaway was Keeper of the Department of Chemistry at the Science Museum in London for over 20 years, and the physicist Chris Rapley was appointed director of the museum in 2007. Other physicists who are Old Members of the college include Michael Woolfson (a former Professor of Physics at the University of York) and Edward Hinds (whose work on ultra-cold matter won him the Rumford Medal of the Royal Society in 2008). Edwin Stevens, who studied Natural Science at the college, went on to design the world's first wearable hearing aid, and Sir Graham Sutton became director-general of the Meteorological Office.

Other academics

Educators

Artists and writers

Broadcasters and entertainers

Musicians

Sports people

Other people in public life

Fictional students of Jesus College

References 
Notes

Bibliography

  Cited in references as: Baker
  Cited in references as: Foster, 1500–1714
  Cited in references as: Foster, 1715–1886
  Cited in references as: Oxford Men
  Cited in references as: Members List
  Cited in references as: ODNB 
  Cited in references as: Honours
  Cited in references as: Members 1972
  Cited in references as: Honours Supplement 1930
  Cited in references as: Honours Supplement 1950
  Cited in references as: Honours Supplement 1965
  Cited in references as: DWB
  Cited in references as: Who's Who 
  Cited in references as: Who Was Who

External links 
 List of notable Old Members, Jesus College website

Lists of people associated with the University of Oxford